Léon Tétart (date of birth unknown, died January 1926) was a French sports shooter. He competed in six events at the 1908 Summer Olympics.

References

Year of birth missing
1926 deaths
French male sport shooters
Olympic shooters of France
Shooters at the 1908 Summer Olympics
Place of birth missing